Metro is Indonesian flagship news television program which broadcasts on Metro TV. There is no single show, but instead consisting of Metro Pagi Primetime (morning), Metro Siang (lunchtime), Metro Sore (afternoon), Metro Hari Ini (afternoon), Primetime News (evening), Top News, and Metro Malam (late night).

SHoWS
Before January 2, 2017, the shows Metro Kini (morning) and Metro Sore (afternoon) was still aired before the date, and Metro Pagi Primetime was originally named Metro Pagi.                  NeWS fLash Suara ANda    Metro SportS Soccer TimeS   WorLd NeWS     ''

Time slot history

Metro Hari Ini
 18:30-19:30 WIB (25 November 2000-31 March 2001, Monday-Friday)
 18:30-19:00 WIB (27 November 2000-1 April 2001, Saturday-Sunday)
 18:05-19:30 WIB (2 April 2001-22 November 2002, Monday-Friday)
 18:05-19:00 WIB (7 April 2001-24 November 2002, Saturday-Sunday)
 18:05-19:00 WIB (25 November 2002-24 November 2008)
 17:30-19:00 WIB (25 November 2008-20 May 2010)
 17:05-19:00 WIB (21 May 2010-2012)
 16:30-18:00 WIB (2013-2017)
 16:30-18:00 WIB (2017-2019 (for Monday to Friday), 2017-2018 (for Saturday and Sunday))
 16:30-17:30 WIB (2018-31 December 2020, for Saturday and Sunday)
 15:30-17:00 WIB (2019 and 2021 during Ramadan month only)
 16:00-17:30 WIB (2020-31 December 2020, for Monday-Friday)
 14:30-16:00 WIB (2020, Ramadhan 1441 Hijri)
 16:05-17:30 WIB (2021-present)

Metro Pagi Primetime
 05:30-07:30 WIB (2 April 2001-22 November 2002, From Monday To Friday)
 06:05-07:00 WIB (7 April 2001-24 November 2002, From Saturday To Sunday)
 05:30-07:00 WIB (25 November 2002-28 November 2003, From Monday To Sunday, 1 December 2003-22 April 2005, From Monday To Friday)
 05:30-06:30 WIB (25 April 2005-25 November 2005)
 05:05-06:30 WIB (25 November 2005-17 February 2008)
 05:05-06:00 WIB (18 February 2008-24 November 2008)
 04:30-06:00 WIB (25 November 2008-24 November 2009)
 04:30-07:00 WIB (25 November 2009-31 December 2013, 2017-2020)
 04:30-06:00 WIB (1 January 2014-2016, 2017 for Saturday editions)
 06:05-07:00 WIB (2020)
 05:05-06:30 WIB (2021-2022)
 04:30-06:30 WIB (2022-present)

Metro Siang
 12:05-12:30 WIB (25 November 2000-31 March 2001)
 12:05-13:00 WIB (2013-2015 (for Monday to Friday), 2015- 2016 (for Saturday and Sunday))
 11:30-12:30 WIB (2001-2004 (for Monday to Friday), 2014- 2015 (for Saturday and Sunday))
 11:05-13:00 WIB (2004]-2012, 2017-31 December 2020) (for Monday to Friday), (2018-31 December 2020), (for Saturday and Sunday), (2021-present)
 11:30-13:00 WIB (2013-2014, 2015-2016 (for Monday to Friday))
 11:05-12:00 WIB (2017-2018 (for Saturday and Sunday))

Indonesian television news shows
2000 Indonesian television series debuts
2010s Indonesian television series
2000s Indonesian television series
Metro TV (Indonesian TV network) original programming